List of the provincial governors (ผู้ว่าราชการจังหวัด) of Surat Thani Province, Thailand.

Comment: Till 1941 the Thai year began on April 1, thus some of the years in the table above may be off by one

References
List at www.suratthani.go.th

Surat Thani
Surat Thani province

Governors of Surat Thani